Monsano is a comune (municipality) in the Province of Ancona in the Italian region Marche, located about  west of Ancona.

Monsano borders the following municipalities: Jesi, Monte San Vito, San Marcello.

References

Cities and towns in the Marche